Lautém (Tetum: Lautein) is a toponym for a place eastmost in East Timor. It may refer to, from small to large:

 Lautém (city)
 Lautém Administrative Post
 Lautém Municipality